The Way is the self-titled debut album recorded by Jesus music band The Way, released in 1973 on Maranatha! Records.

Track listing

Personnel
 The Way – producer
 Buck Herring – engineer
 Buddy King – engineer
 Buddy King Studio, Huntington Beach, California – recording location
 Mama Jo's, North Hollywood California – recording location for "New Song" and "Song of Joy" and remixing location
 Chuck Johnson – remixer
 Gary Arthur – design
 Neal Buchanan – art
 Woody Blackburn – photography
 Tracy Guthrie – clay sculptures for front cover
 Tom Stipe – special thanks
 Chuck Butler – special thanks
 Tom Coomes – special thanks
 Chuck Girard – special thanks

References
 
 
 The Way. 1973 Maranatha! Music. HS 777/7

1973 debut albums